Ian Whyte (13 August 1901 – 27 March 1960) was a Scottish conductor and composer, and founder of the BBC Scottish Symphony Orchestra.

Born in Dunfermline, Whyte studied in London, and was a pupil of Stanford and Ralph Vaughan Williams at the Royal College of Music.  He became head of BBC music in Scotland in 1931, holding the position until 1945, when he became conductor of the BBC Scottish Orchestra (later to become the BBC Scottish Symphony Orchestra), a position he held until 1960.  His own considerable output, such as the ballet Donald of the Burthens (1951), was influenced by Scottish themes and folk tunes.

References

External links

1901 births
1961 deaths
Scottish conductors (music)
British male conductors (music)
Scottish composers
British ballet composers
People from Dunfermline
Alumni of the Royal College of Music
20th-century British conductors (music)
20th-century British composers
20th-century Scottish male musicians
BBC Orchestras